Hercules of the Forum Boarium is one of two gilded bronze statues of Hercules found on the site of the Forum Boarium  of ancient Rome. The two statues were both placed in the Palazzo Dei Convervatori for safe keeping in 1950 and remain there today. The Hercules of Forum Boarium was likely to have been a cult image of Temple of Hercules that stood by the ancient cattle market.

Description
The bronze sculpture is slightly over life-sized and is in the Hellenistic style of the second century BCE. The Hellenistic style was based on the canon of proportions that had been established by Lysippos in the early fourth century BCE. The muscles on the sculpture are exaggerated and the head is proportionally smaller when compared to the rest of the body. The Forum Boarium statue is one of the two surviving full-sized Greek statues from ancient Greece. The second Hercules statue was discovered near the Theatre of Pompey. The Hercules of the Theatre of Pompey had been carefully buried under protective tiles and incised FCS (Fulgor Conditum Summanium) because it was constantly hit by lightning. The Hercules of the Theatre of Pompey depicts him leaning on his club vertically as he holds the apple of Hesperides in his left hand. On his left forearm, he has draped the skin of the Nemean Lion that he defeated on his first Labor.
Both sculptures display contrapposto, a typical style from Lysippos in which the figure's weight is thrown entirely on one foot. Though their muscles are exaggerated, they stand in marked contrast to the bearded, burly and perhaps more familiar Farnese Hercules.

Subject 

The statue of Hercules from Forum Boarium is based on his twelve labors where he must bring back the Golden Apples of Hesperides to Eurystheus. Hercules found Prometheus during his search and freed him from his prison. In return, Prometheus told him where he could find the Golden Apples. The apples were guarded by a hundred-headed dragon named Ladon who could not be conquered by Hercules. To defeat Ladon, he needed the help of Atlas, the titan that held the Earth and Heavens on his shoulder. Hercules managed to convince Atlas to help him get the apples, but in exchange, Hercules would have to carry the weight of the world while Atlas acquired the apples. When Atlas returned with the apples, he did not want to retake the weight of the world back. Hercules tricked Atlas by saying that he would gladly stay and hold up the world, but asked Atlas if he could take the weight again so he can adjust his cloak. Atlas took back the weight of the world and Hercules immediately picked up the Golden Apples and ran off.

History

The temple of the Forum Boarium in Rome is located by the Tiber River. The statue was first created for the cult of Ara Maxima, which was dedicated to Hercules by the Greek king Evander. Legend states that the statue was created to commemorate the story of Hercules killing the robber Cacus, who attempted to steal the cattle of Geryon. During the early Renaissance, the little that was left of the temple was demolished under the orders of Sixtus IV. The temple was converted into a church.  This statue of Hercules was moved to the Palazzo dei Conservatori on the Campidoglio in 1510 The statue of Hercules Aemilianus is believed to have been commissioned by either Aemilius Paullus, who dedicated a tomb to Hercules, or by Scipio Aemilianus. The statue was found after Romans demolished a portion to create space for their new rotunda. There are two ancient temples where the statue may have been displayed: the temple located between Circus Maximus and the Church of Santa Maria and the temple of Hercules Ameliana. The statue of Hercules of the Theatre of Pompey, or also known as the statue of Hercules Inviticus, was discovered in 1864 near the Theatre of Pompey. This is the gilded, bronze statue of Hercules that is now located in the Vatican Rotunda.

Notes

References
Haskell, Francis, and Nicholas Penny, 1981. Taste and the Antique: The Lure of Classical Sculpture 1500-1900 (Yale University Press) Cat. no. 45.
Platner, Samuel Ball, and Thomas Ashby, 1926. A Topographical Dictionary of Ancient Rome, (London: Oxford University Press): "Aedes Herculis Victoris" (On-line text)

External links
Dr Mary Ann Sullivan, "Hercules, Capitoline Museum" Photographs of the Hercules
	

Ancient Greek sculptures
Ancient Greek metalwork
Sculptures of Heracles
Bronze sculptures in Rome
Statues in Italy
Nude sculptures in Italy
Sculptures in the Capitoline Museums